Koulochera is a mountain in southeastern Laconia, Greece. Its elevation is 1,125 m.

References 
 Giorgos Koutsogiannopoulos, To chorio Metamorfosi, proin Katavothra, Metamorfosi 1996

Mountains of Greece
Landforms of Laconia
Mountains of Peloponnese (region)